Belle Vue Airfield (often classed as airport or heliport) is a single runway airfield about  north east of Great Torrington in North Devon, England. It is for general and private aviation only, and the 580 meter, or 1,902 foot, runway is grass.

It is most popular for model aircraft flying clubs like the Midlands Large Model Aircraft Flying Club to fly their planes at special events here. It is one of the smallest aviation hubs in Devon.

It was previously the second hub for Devon Air Ambulance.

References

External links
 Devon Strut entry for airfield

Airports in Devon